I Know You by Heart may refer to:

 "I Know You by Heart", a duet by Dolly Parton and Smokey Robinson from Parton's 1987 album Rainbow
 "I Know You by Heart", a duet by Bette Midler and David Pack from the soundtrack for the 1988 film Beaches
 "I Know You by Heart", a song by Eva Cassidy from her 1997 album Eva by Heart